Allemant is a commune in the department of Aisne in the Hauts-de-France region of northern France.

Geography
Allemant is located some 10 km northeast of Soissons and 15 km southwest of Laon.  National Highway N2 from Soissons to Laon passes along its southern border and has exits at both the southwestern and southeastern corners of the commune. On the western side the D26, which exits from the N2, forms part of the western border of the commune and then passes through the western portion of the commune. Nevertheless, there is no connection between this road and the village which must be accessed from the north on the road D143 coming south from its junction with the D14 near Pinon. The exit from the N2 at the southeastern corner leads to the D14 road which does not pass through the commune. There are however a number of country roads leading from this exit into the commune and by which the village can be reached. The commune is covered more or less equally by farmland and forest.

Neighbouring communes and towns

History
On 17 June 1944 a German V-1 flying bomb launched from Vignacourt in the Somme deviated from its path and fell in the territory of the commune at 4.30am. Hitler was visiting his headquarters in Margival - the Wolfsschlucht II, only 3 km away - to discuss the situation on the Normandy front with Marshals Rommel and von Rundstedt but, as a result of the flying bomb deviation, rushed back to Germany and did not go as planned to the La Roche-Guyon headquarters of Rommel. This was his only visit to the fortified headquarters and his last visit to France.

Administration

List of Successive Mayors of Allemant

Population

Culture and heritage

Religious heritage

See also 
 Communes of the Aisne department

References

External links
Allemant on the old IGN website 
40000 Bells website 
Allemant on Géoportail, National Geographic Institute (IGN) website 
Allement on the 1750 Cassini Map

Communes of Aisne